Phil Alexander Robertson (born April 24, 1946) is an American professional hunter, businessman (Duck Commander company), and reality television star on the popular television series Duck Dynasty. He is also featured on the television show Duck Commander, a hunting program on the Outdoor Channel.

He attended Louisiana Tech University, where he played football. He received a master's degree in education and spent several years teaching.

Robertson was the subject of controversy after a 2013 interview he did with GQ magazine, where he said that homosexual behavior was sinful. As a result, A&E suspended him from Duck Dynasty. Facing a strong backlash from his supporters, A&E lifted the suspension after nine days.

Early life and education
Robertson was born in Vivian, Louisiana. He was the fifth of seven children of Merritt (née Hale) and James Robertson. Because of financial setbacks during his childhood, the family lived in rugged conditions, having no electricity, toilet or bathtub. The family rarely went into town to buy groceries, and instead lived off of the fruits and vegetables they grew in their garden; the meat from deer, squirrels, fish and other game they hunted and fished; and the pigs, chickens, and cattle they raised.

In his book, Happy, Happy, Happy, Robertson recalls that "It was the 1950s when I was a young boy, but we lived like it was the 1850s ... but we were always happy, happy, happy no matter the circumstances."

Halfway between Vivian and Hosston is Robertson's restored log cabin birth home. The property is owned by Robertson's cousin, Nathan Hale.

College and football

As an athlete in high school, Robertson was all-state in football, baseball, and track, which afforded him the opportunity to attend Louisiana Tech in Ruston on a football scholarship in the late 1960s. At Tech, he played first-string quarterback for the Bulldogs, ahead of Pro Football Hall of Famer Terry Bradshaw, the first overall pick in the 1970 NFL Draft. When he arrived at Tech in 1966, Bradshaw caused a media frenzy on account of his reputation of being a football sensation from nearby Shreveport. Robertson was a year ahead of Bradshaw, and was the starter for two seasons in 1966 and 1967, and chose not to play in 1968.

In his time at Louisiana Tech, Robertson completed 179 of 411 passing attempts for 2,237 yards. He threw 12 touchdowns, but had 34 interceptions. It was thought Robertson had the potential for a pro career, but Robertson was more interested in hunting. Bradshaw once remarked about Robertson's love of hunting, saying "... Phil Robertson, loved hunting more than he loved football. He'd come to practice directly from the woods, squirrel tails hanging out of his pockets, duck feathers on his clothes. Clearly he was a fine shot, so no one complained too much."

When Paul Harvey approached Robertson with a recruitment to play professionally for the Washington Redskins, he declined because football conflicted with his hunting. Additionally, football was only about holding up his scholarship to him, while Bradshaw practically lived and breathed the sport. Robertson put it this way: "Terry went for the bucks, and I chased after the ducks."

Robertson later received a bachelor's degree in physical education and a master's in education.

Career

Early career
Robertson initially spent several years teaching before becoming a commercial fisherman. In the 1970s, his marriage became strained. Robertson was running a bar in 1975.

Duck Commander
As an avid duck hunter, Robertson was dissatisfied with the condition of duck calls. He began to experiment with making a call that would produce the exact sound of a duck. He invented his first Duck Commander call in 1972. He received a patent for this call and the Duck Commander Company was incorporated in 1973. Today, the company of Duck Commander is a multimillion-dollar business, headed by his son, Willie Robertson. Robertson and his family were portrayed on the A&E reality television series Duck Dynasty, which ran from 2012 to 2017, and covered their daily lives within Duck Commander.

Other media
Robertson was featured in Steve Bannon's film Torchbearer, in which he talks about the absurdity of life without God, using events like The Holocaust to illustrate the point. In October 2017, Robertson joined CRTV as a contributor, hosting In the Woods with Phil.

Controversies

GQ comments

On December 18, 2013, A&E announced the indefinite suspension of Robertson from the network following an interview with Drew Magary of GQ. When during the interview for a featured article in GQ's January 2014 issue entitled What the Duck? Robertson was asked what he thought was sinful and responded, "Start with homosexual behavior and just morph out from there. Bestiality, sleeping around with this woman and that woman and that woman and those men."  He paraphrased a Biblical passage from First Corinthians by saying "Don't be deceived.  Neither the adulterers, the idolaters, the male prostitutes, the homosexual offenders, the greedy, the drunkards, the slanderers, the swindlers—they won't inherit the kingdom of God. Don't deceive yourself. It's not right."  Robertson also questioned the appeal of same-sex relationships saying that a vagina is more appealing to a man.  Robertson said that he does not judge anyone, but leaves that up to God saying, "We just love 'em, give 'em the good news about Jesus—whether they're homosexuals, drunks, terrorists. We let God sort 'em out later, you see what I'm saying?"

In response to initial criticisms A&E released a statement from Robertson saying, "I would never treat anyone with disrespect just because they are different from me". Later that day the network announced his suspension. After a strong backlash from supporters, including a Facebook page that accumulated 1.5 million likes and statements from political figures condemning the move, A&E lifted the suspension before any  episode was affected.

CPAC comments
In 2015, Robertson made further controversial comments when he was awarded the 2015 Breitbart Defender of the First Amendment Award. In a half-hour speech to CPAC, Robertson asserted that STDs are the legacy of Nazis, communists, beatniks, and hippies. He also told a long and graphic anecdote about an atheist and his family being murdered, and that the assailants would say "But you're the one who says there is no God, there's no right, there's no wrong, so we're just having fun." His statements went viral.

Personal life
Robertson and Marsha "Miss Kay" Carroway started dating in 1964 as "high school sweethearts." The couple was married in 1966. Despite early troubles in their marriage due to Robertson's "sex, drugs and rock 'n' roll lifestyle," a 2013 editorial published by Yahoo TV correspondent Kelly Woo described the Robertsons' union as a "long-standing, rock-solid marriage." Their first son, Alan, was born while they were attending college.

Robertson is a devout Christian, a member of and elder at the White's Ferry Road Church of Christ in West Monroe, and is outspoken about his beliefs. He had various personal problems in his 20s including excessive alcohol drinking, causing a separation in the marriage for a period and he credits a subsequent religious awakening for being able to overcome the problems. Robertson opposes abortion and has called it a violation of the Declaration of Independence. He frequently speaks about the issue during public appearances. In 2013, alongside joint author Mark Schlabach, Robertson published a memoir titled Happy, Happy, Happy.

In a 2013 special election, Robertson made a television commercial endorsing Vance McAllister, a Republican candidate for the Robertson family's home district, . McAllister, who had never held political office, defeated the thought-to-be frontrunner, state senator Neil Riser. Many attributed the strength of McAllister's come-from-behind victory to the Robertson endorsement. In 2016, Phil Robertson endorsed Ted Cruz for President. As Cruz dropped out of the race, Robertson, while at Cannes, endorsed Donald Trump for President. In 2017, in the Alabama run-off election, he endorsed Roy Moore for the U.S. Senate. In a primary rally of his, he went and made a speech in his defense about what he felt made the Ten Commandments important to keep as part of being on display in courtrooms.

In either December 2016 or January 2017, after Ben Carson stepped down from the chairmanship of American Legacy Center's "Fight for the Court" project, Robertson filled the vacancy.

On May 28, 2020, it was revealed that Phil has learned he has a daughter named Phyllis from an affair in the 1970s.

References

External links
 American Legacy Center: Fight for the Court
 
 

1946 births
20th-century Christians
21st-century Christians
American football quarterbacks
American inventors
American members of the Churches of Christ
American YouTubers
Businesspeople from Louisiana
Christians from Louisiana
Critics of atheism
Living people
Lifestyle YouTubers
Louisiana Republicans
Louisiana Tech Bulldogs football players
North Caddo High School alumni
Participants in American reality television series
People from Vivian, Louisiana
People from West Monroe, Louisiana
Robertson family
Blaze Media people
YouTube channels launched in 2016
YouTube podcasters
Conservatism in the United States